The Marble Range is a small mountain range adjoining the Fraser River on the southwestern edge of the Interior Plateau of British Columbia.  It has an area of 1,250 square kilometres and about 65 km NNW to SSE and about 20 km wide.  Its southern flank is the north wall of Marble Canyon and the valley occupied by the ranching and First Nations community of Pavilion.

See also
Clear Range
Pavilion Lake

References

Marble Range in the Canadian Mountain Encyclopedia

Mountain ranges of the Interior Plateau
Fraser Canyon
Lillooet Country
Landforms of the Cariboo